Larry Dale (born Ennis L. Lowery, January 7, 1923 – May 19, 2010) was an American blues singer, guitarist and session musician.

Life and career
He was born in Hungerford, Texas, United States.  During the early 1950s he took initial inspiration on guitar playing from B.B. King, making his first recordings as a sideman for Paul Williams and his Orchestra (on Jax Records), and for Big Red McHouston & His Orchestra.  Taking the name Larry Dale, he recorded for the RCA subsidiary Groove Records with a band that included Mickey Baker and pianist Champion Jack Dupree.  He also wrote songs using the name Larry Dale Matthews.

Dale performed on the New York club circuit with the pianist Bob Gaddy in the 1950s. He was also a frequent session guitarist in the New York studios, playing on all four of Dupree's 1956–58 sessions for RCA's Groove and Vik subsidiaries, and on the best known Dupree LP, 1958's Blues from the Gutter, for Atlantic. His playing on that album inspired Brian Jones of The Rolling Stones.  Dale made most of his best sides as a leader when the decade turned from the 1950s to the 1960s. For Glover Records he recorded the party blues "Let the Doorbell Ring" and "Big Muddy" in 1960, then revived Stick McGhee's "Drinkin' Wine-Spo-Dee-O-Dee" in 1962 on Atlantic.

He died in New York in May 2010, at the age of 87.

References

External links
 John Broven: "Larry Dale: The New York Houserocker".- Juke Blues # 9 (summer 1987), p. 4-8
 Illustrated Larry Dale discography
 Larry Dale profile, Big Road Blues

1923 births
2010 deaths
People from Wharton, Texas
American blues guitarists
American male guitarists
American blues singers
East Coast blues musicians
Groove Records artists
RCA Victor artists
Fire Records artists
Atlantic Records artists
20th-century American guitarists
African-American guitarists
20th-century African-American male singers